Tin Star Orphans is a Canadian indie rock/alt country band from Toronto, Ontario. Originally formed in 2004 as Yonder, the group currently consists of leader Zachary Bennett, (vocals. guitar), Dean Marino (lead guitars/vocals), Johnny Rowe (drums), Dave Fenton (bass) and Steve Savage (keyboards).

History
In 2004, Zachary Bennett approached Dean Marino, an engineer and budding producer, to record some demos of his band, Yonder.  Given a small budget, Marino suggested that the band make the recordings at guitarist Adam Evans's cottage rather than in a recording studio. The result of this three-day session was the Yonder EP, which included early versions of the songs "If Only" and "Jesus Freaks". The EP allowed Bennett to book some gigs in and around Toronto, eventually establishing a monthly showcase Bennett named "Dusty’s Conundrum", at Clinton's Tavern. During this period (2004–2006), Bennett was able to test his songs on an audience as he established a devoted following and a semi-stable line-up for the band. This included Allison Porter on fiddle, Adam Evans on guitar and Travis Ferris on bass.

In 2006 Bennett approached Marino again with the intent of making a "proper album" at Marino's studio, Chemical Sound. Bennett and Marino took on complementary roles during the making of the album (they are both credited as producers). This eventually morphed into a collaborative musical partnership, with Marino playing several guitar tracks on the finished album (alongside Adam Evans and Mike Daley who also contributed guitar tracks). The album, Skywalk to Crescent Town, was self-released in 2007 and garnered positive reviews. In late 2007, Dean Marino officially joined Yonder as lead guitarist. The band continued to play steadily in and around Toronto, adding Todd Harrison (keyboards) and Johnny Rowe (drums) to the line-up.

In December 2008, Yonder were signed to Sparks Music, a label known for releasing acts such as Spiral Beach and The Priddle Concern. Sparks' first move was to re-release Skywalk, but the band decided to change their name to "Tin Star Orphans" and so the album was renamed Yonder, as a homage to their former moniker.

In August 2009, Todd Harrison left the band to "focus on other interests". He was replaced by Steve Savage.

In December 2009, the band began work on their sophomore effort, titled The Days of Blinding Fear. In February 2010 the album was made available for streaming at thedaysofblindingfear.com. The band sold hand-printed limited editions of the album starting on 15 May 2010. The album was then re-released on Sept 21, 2010 by Sparks Music.

Discography

Albums
 Yonder (May 2009) No. 42 !EARSHOT CAN 
 The Days of Blinding Fear (2010)

Singles
 "Let You Down" (May 2009)

Promotional videos
 "Let You Down" (2009, directed by Sammy Ray Welch)

Television
The song "Let You Down" was featured on the television show One Tree Hill, episode 122(16), "Screenwriter's Blues."

Film
The song "Let You Down" was featured in the motion picture Suck.

References

External links 
 Official website
 Tin Star Orphans MySpace

Musical groups established in 2009
Musical groups from Toronto
Canadian indie rock groups
Canadian alternative country groups
2009 establishments in Ontario